is a micro-asteroid, classified as a near-Earth object of the Apollo group, approximately 10–20 meters in diameter. It was first observed by Pan-STARRS at Haleakala Observatory, Hawaii, on 11 October 2017.

Peaking near a magnitude of 18, the object was too faint to be seen—except for the largest telescopes.

As of 2018,  has a poorly determined orbit with an uncertainty of 6 and a short observation arc of 8 days only.

See also 
  – A similar small asteroid that passed close to the earth on 12 October 2017

References

External links 
 MPEC 2017-U33 : 2017 TD6, Minor Planet Electronic Circular (MPEC)
 Near-Earth asteroid 2017 TD6 very close encounter: an image (18 Oct. 2017)
 Asteroid 2017 TD6 to flyby Earth at 0.5 LD on October 19, 2017,  The Watchers, 18 October 2017
 
 
 

Minor planet object articles (unnumbered)
20171011
20171011